The American Racing Drivers Club (ARDC) is an open-wheel midget car racing sanctioning body that operates primarily in the Mid-Atlantic area of the United States.

History
The American Racing Drivers Club was organized in 1939, making it one of the oldest sanctioning bodies in the United States, predating NASCAR by nearly a decade. The purpose of the organization was to represent the drivers and car owners in dealing with track owners and promoters. The club's first president was Bill Schindler. and the first vice presidentfrom 1939 was tony bonadies till his death at Williams Grove pa in 1964. Ed "Dutch" Schaefer was elected president in 1952. Schaefer reigned until 1968, when the series featured 51 races and $93,000 in prize money.

ARDC Midget Car Series

ARDC Midget Car Season Champions

1940 - Bill Schindler
1941 - Henry Banks
1945 - Bill Schindler
1946 - Bill Schindler
1947 - George Rice
1948 - Bill Schindler
1949 - Mike Nazaruk
1950 - Nick Fornoro Sr.
1951 - Fred Jiggs Peters
1952 - Steve McGrath
1953 - Mike Nazaruk
1954 - Vernon Land
1955 - Len Duncan
1956 - Ed "Dutch" Schaefer
1957 - Ed "Dutch" Schaefer
1958 - Len Duncan
1959 - Len Duncan
1960 - Ed "Dutch" Schaefer
1961 - Len Duncan
1962 - Len Duncan
1963 - Len Duncan
1964 - Len Duncan
1965 - Ed "Dutch" Schaefer
1966 - Joe Csiki
1967 - Len Duncan
1968 - Johnny Coy Sr.
1969 - Johnny Coy Sr.
1970 - Tom McAndrew
1971 - Johnny Coy Sr.
1972 - Johnny Coy Sr.
1973 - Leigh Earnshaw Jr.
1974 - Leigh Earnshaw Jr.
1975 - Leigh Earnshaw Jr.
1976 - Bob Cicconi
1977 - Lenny Boyd
1978 - George Ferguson Jr
1979 - Hank Rogers Jr.
1980 - Leigh Earnshaw Jr.
1981 - Hank Rogers Jr.
1982 - Nick Fornoro Jr.
1983 - Nick Fornoro Jr.
1984 - Nick Fornoro Jr.
1985 - Nick Fornoro Jr.
1986 - Nick Fornoro Jr.
1987 - Brett Mowrey
1988 - Billy Hughes
1989 - Billy Hughes
1990 - Billy Hughes
1991 - Lou Cicconi Jr
1992 - Joey Coy
1993 - Lou Cicconi Jr
1994 - Lou Cicconi Jr
1995 - Nick Fornoro Jr.
1996 - Phil DiMario
1997 - Ed Stimely Jr
1998 - Bryan Kobylarz
1999 - Bryan Kobylarz
2000 - Ray Bull
2001 - Ray Bull
2002 - Ray Bull
2003 - Ray Bull
2004 - Ray Bull
2005 - Ray Bull
2006 - Andy Martin
2007 - Andy Martin
2008 - Randy Monroe Jr.
2009 - Frank Polimeda
2010 - Steve Buckwalter
2011 - Drew Heistand
2012 - Tim Buckwalter
2013 - Trevor Kobylarz
2014 - Steven Drevicki
2015 - Steven Drevicki
2016 - Alex Bright
2017 - Ryan Greth

Reference (1940-2015):

Other notable racers
Mario Andretti, 1961 to mid-1962
Jan Opperman
Johnny Thomson

The Cars

Registered midget Chassis in ARDC range from Spike, Stealth, Bullet, Hawk, F5, Bishop, and Beast. The engines range from Chevy, Ford, Volkswagen, Pontiac, and Mopar, with big-name motor builders such as Alan Johnson, Ed Pink, Gaerte, Brayton, Hawk, Fontana, and Don Ott. With one competitive Personal Motor Builder, Mark Piazza.

See also
National Midget Auto Racing Hall of Fame

References

External links
ARDC Homepage
ARDC Record Book
National Midget Auto Racing Hall of Fame
Eastern Museum of Motor Racing
Chili Bowl Nationals

Open wheel racing
1939 establishments in the United States
Auto racing organizations in the United States